2/3 may refer to:
 A fraction with decimal value 0.6666...
 A way to write the expression "2 ÷ 3" ("two divided by three")
 2nd Battalion, 3rd Marines of the United States Marine Corps
 February 3
 March 2